The enzyme lysophospholipase (EC 3.1.1.5) catalyzes the reaction

2-lysophosphatidylcholine + H2O  glycerophosphocholine + a carboxylate

This enzyme belongs to the family of hydrolases, specifically those acting on carboxylic ester bonds.  This family consists of lysophospholipase / phospholipase B (EC 3.1.1.5) and cytosolic phospholipase A2 which also has a C2 domain . Phospholipase B enzymes catalyse the release of fatty acids from lysophospholipids and are capable in vitro of hydrolyzing all phospholipids extractable from yeast cells. Cytosolic phospholipase A2 associates with natural membranes in response to physiological increases in Ca2+ and selectively hydrolyses arachidonyl phospholipids, the aligned region corresponds the carboxy-terminal Ca2+-independent catalytic domain of the protein as discussed in.

The systematic name of this enzyme class is 2-lysophosphatidylcholine acylhydrolase. Other names in common use include lecithinase B, lysolecithinase, phospholipase B, lysophosphatidase, lecitholipase, phosphatidase B, lysophosphatidylcholine hydrolase, lysophospholipase A1, lysophopholipase L2, lysophospholipase transacylase, neuropathy target esterase, NTE, NTE-LysoPLA, and NTE-lysophospholipase.  This enzyme participates in glycerophospholipid metabolism.

Examples 
Human genes encoding proteins that contain this domain include:
 PLA2G4A, PLA2G4B, PLA2G4C, PLA2G4D, PLA2G4E, PLA2G4F

See also 
Charcot-Leyden crystals

References

Further reading 

 
 
 
 
 
 
 
 
 
 
 

EC 3.1.1
Enzymes of known structure